Roger Marshall (15 March 1934 – 1 April 2020) was an English television screenwriter, known as co-creator of the series Public Eye.

He was born in March 1934 in Leicester, England and educated at Gonville and Caius College, Cambridge. After leaving university, he embarked on a writing career that included The Avengers, The Sweeney, Survivors,  The Gentle Touch, The Professionals, Travelling Man, Lovejoy, Floodtide and London's Burning as well as many other popular television series. He was married with two children: Rodney Marshall, a teacher and freelance writer, and Christopher. He was also a fan of Ipswich Town FC and Northamptonshire CCC. Marshall died in April 2020 at the age of 86.

References

External links

1934 births
2020 deaths
English television writers
Alumni of Gonville and Caius College, Cambridge
Writers from Leicester